Warkworth AFC is a semi-professional association football club in the town of Warkworth, New Zealand. They provide a football experience for all ages and ability.

Honours
US1 Premiership (1) 2010,

References
1. UltimateNZSoccer website's Warkworth AFC's page

External links
 Warkworth AFC'S US1 Page
 Warkworth AFC Official Website

Association football clubs established in 1890
Association football clubs in New Zealand
1890 establishments in New Zealand